Carlos Manuel Cardoso Mané (born 11 March 1994) is a Portuguese professional footballer who plays for Turkish club Kayserispor mainly as a right winger.

He began his career at Sporting CP, playing 93 competitive games and scoring 14 goals while winning four cup trophies. During loans at VfB Stuttgart and 1. FC Union Berlin, he won promotion from the 2. Bundesliga both times.

Mané earned 73 caps for Portugal and scored 16 times across all youth levels, including representing the country at the 2016 Olympics.

Club career

Sporting CP
Born in Lisbon, Mané joined local Sporting CP at age nine. On 9 December 2012, he made his senior debut, appearing with the B team in a second division match against C.D. Aves after coming on as a substitute for Jorge Chula in the 78th minute of a 2–2 home draw. Exactly one month later, for the same competition, he scored his first professional goal, at C.F. Os Belenenses (2–1 loss).

Mané played his first match in the Primeira Liga with the Lions on 5 October 2013, entering the pitch in the dying minutes of a 4–0 home win over Vitória de Setúbal. His first goal in the competition arrived on 15 February of the following year, when he started and scored in the 1–0 defeat of S.C. Olhanense also at the Estádio José Alvalade.

Mané scored his first goal in the UEFA Champions League in only his third appearance in the competition, opening an eventual 3–1 group stage home victory over NK Maribor on 25 November 2014 where he started and played 65 minutes. He played six games of the team's victorious run in  the Taça de Portugal, netting the winner against F.C. Vizela in the fifth round and the equaliser away to C.D. Nacional in the first leg of the semi-final.

On 31 August 2016, Mané was loaned out to VfB Stuttgart until June 2018, with the German club having an option to buy. In his first match, he scored twice in the opening four minutes to help to a 4–0 home win over Greuther Fürth, a new record for a debuting player in the German professional leagues. However, his overall stint at the Mercedes-Benz Arena was largely undermined by injury.

Mané returned to the German 2. Bundesliga in January 2019, joining 1. FC Union Berlin on loan until June with the option to make the move permanent. Hampered by a series of minor physical problems, he played eight games as the team from the capital were promoted to the Bundesliga for the first time, and they did not exercise the option.

Rio Ave
On 20 July 2019, Mané ended his 16-year association with Sporting by signing a three-year deal with Rio Ave F.C. of the same league, being presented at half-time in a pre-season friendly. He made his debut on 3 August in a 6–1 home rout of U.D. Oliveirense in the first round of the Taça da Liga, as a 46th-minute substitute for Gabrielzinho. On 21 November, also at the Estádio dos Arcos, he scored his first goal for the club, the only one against Vitória de Setúbal.

In his second season in Vila do Conde, Mané was his team's top scorer with six goals, including a late winner to avoid instant relegation on the last day at the expense of C.D. Nacional. Nonetheless, they went down following a playoff defeat by F.C. Arouca.

Kayserispor
On 13 August 2021, Mané joined Turkish club Kayserispor for an undisclosed transfer fee.

International career
Having already represented the Portugal national team at every level from under-15 onwards, Mané was part of the under-19 side that reached the semi-finals of the 2013 UEFA European Championship. During the tournament in Lithuania, he scored in a 4–2 victory over the hosts in the group stage.

Mané was also chosen in Rui Jorge's under-23 squad for the 2016 Olympics in Brazil, making two starts and a substitute appearance for the quarter-finalists.

Career statistics

Honours
Sporting CP
Taça de Portugal: 2014–15, 2018–19
Taça da Liga: 2018–19
Supertaça Cândido de Oliveira: 2015

Portugal
UEFA European Under-21 Championship runner-up: 2015

References

External links

1994 births
Living people
Portuguese sportspeople of Bissau-Guinean descent
Black Portuguese sportspeople
Portuguese footballers
Footballers from Lisbon
Association football wingers
Association football forwards
Primeira Liga players
Liga Portugal 2 players
Sporting CP B players
Sporting CP footballers
Rio Ave F.C. players
2. Bundesliga players
VfB Stuttgart players
1. FC Union Berlin players
Süper Lig players
Kayserispor footballers
Portugal youth international footballers
Portugal under-21 international footballers
Footballers at the 2016 Summer Olympics
Olympic footballers of Portugal
Portuguese expatriate footballers
Expatriate footballers in Germany
Expatriate footballers in Turkey
Portuguese expatriate sportspeople in Germany
Portuguese expatriate sportspeople in Turkey